HMS Nimble was a wooden Philomel-class gunvessel of the Royal Navy. She was equipped with 5 guns. She became a drill ship for the Royal Naval Reserve at Hull in 1885 and was disposed of in 1906.

History
HMS Nimble was launched on 15 September 1860 from the Pembroke Dockyard. In 1861 she was commanded by Lieutenant  On 1 October 1866, she was blown ashore in a hurricane at Nassau, Bahamas. Commander Frederick William Lee was in command of Nimble from 19 October 1870 to 4 December 1871 and employed at Zanzibar in the suppression of the slave trade. She was placed in harbour service in 1879, and became a Royal Naval Reserve training ship at Hull in 1885.

She was sold to W. R. James on 10 July 1906.

References

Bibliography

External links
Nimble at the William Loney website

1860 ships
Ships built in Pembroke Dock
Philomel-class gunvessels
Victorian-era gunboats of the United Kingdom
Maritime incidents in October 1866